St. John the Baptist Church is an Anglican church in Beeston, Nottinghamshire, England.

The church is Grade II listed by the Department for Digital, Culture, Media and Sport as it is a building of special architectural or historic interest.

History

The church is medieval and the chancel remains, but the remainder was heavily restored and rebuilt in 1842 by George Gilbert Scott and William Bonython Moffatt. It was consecrated on 5 September 1844 by the Bishop of Lincoln.

The organ chamber was added in 1876 by Evans and Jolley of Nottingham. A new lectern and chancel stalls were provided. The chancel stalls were made by Mr. Tattershall of London.

An £860,000 re-ordering and renovation in 2007 moved the main entrance to the west end, and cleaned the interior, with new heating, seating and a new organ.

The font dates from the reign of King Henry III.

List of incumbents

Organ

The first known organ was installed in 1854 by Kirkland and Jardine of Manchester. It cost £300, raised by subscription and was installed on a gallery. It was opened on Tuesday 25 April 1854.

Some extra stops were added in 1856 and in 1876 it was further enlarged and improved and moved to the chancel following demolition of the gallery. In 1903 and 1909 it was renovated by Charles Lloyd of Nottingham and underwent further renovation in 1946. It was removed and replaced with an electronic organ in 1983. This has subsequently been replaced by a new electronic organ in 2008.

List of organists

Gallery

See also
Listed buildings in Beeston, Nottinghamshire

References

Sources
The Buildings of England, Nottinghamshire, Nikolaus Pevsner.

External links
See St. John's Church on Google Street View.

Beeston
beeston
George Gilbert Scott buildings
Beeston, Nottinghamshire